The 2013 Football Federation South Australia season was the 107th season of soccer in South Australia, and the first under the National Premier Leagues format.

League tables

2013 National Premier Leagues SA

The National Premier League South Australia 2013 season was played by 14 teams over 26 rounds, from February to August 2013.

League table

Finals

2013 NPL State League

The 2013 NPL State League was the first edition of the new NPL State League as the second level domestic association football competition in South Australia. 16 teams competed, all playing each other twice for a total of 30 rounds, with the top two at the end of the year being promoted to the 2014 National Premier Leagues South Australia.

2013 Women's Premier League

The highest tier domestic football competition in South Australia for women was known for sponsorship reasons as the Adelaide Airport Women's Premier League. The 8 teams played a triple round-robin for a total of 21 games.

Awards 
The end of year awards were as follows:

National Premier Leagues SA

See also
2013 National Premier Leagues
Football Federation South Australia

Notes

References

2013 in Australian soccer
Football South Australia seasons